Torralba is a town and comune in Sardinia, Italy, administratively part of the province of Sassari.

The communal territory is home to the Nuraghe palace of Nuraghe Santu Antine, the highest and best preserved in Sardinia.

References

Cities and towns in Sardinia